Wu Yi may refer to:

 Wu Yi of Shang (武乙), 12th-century BC king of the Shang dynasty
 Wu Yi (Three Kingdoms) (吳懿), 3rd-century Shu Han general
 Wu Yi (politician) (吴仪; born 1938), PRC Vice-Premier
 Wu Yi (singer) (武艺; born 1990), Hong Kong-Chinese singer
 Wu Yi (scholar) (武億; 1745–1799), Qing dynasty scholar

See also
 Wuyi (disambiguation)